St. Vincent–St. Mary High School is a co-educational college preparatory Catholic high school in Akron, Ohio, United States. It is sponsored by the Society of Mary and is associated with the Diocese of Cleveland. As of the 2017–18 school year, the school had an enrollment of 638 students.

History
The current St. Vincent–St. Mary High School was formed by the merger of St. Vincent and St. Mary High Schools in 1972. The newly merged school took on the athletic nickname of St. Vincent, the Fighting Irish.

In May 2013, St. Vincent–St. Mary alumnus LeBron James donated $1 million to the school for the purpose of renovating their basketball arena. The project included the installation of a new basketball floor, scoreboard, locker rooms, and bleachers, and the seating capacity, which was raised from 1,600 to 1,831. The subsequently renamed LeBron James Arena now also serves as home of the American Basketball Association's Akron Aviators.

St. Mary High School
In 1887 Richard Gilmour, then Bishop of Cleveland, had commissioned Rev. Dr. Thomas F. Mahar, pastor of St. Vincent Church, the oldest Catholic church in Akron, to establish a mission in south Akron. St. Mary Parish was founded by Rev. Mahar in 1896. The high school was founded a year later. St. Mary's athletic teams were formerly known as the Crusaders.

St. Vincent High School
A high school was opened in September 1906 to provide parishioners' sons with a classical education beyond grade school. The parish had already opened St. Vincent Grade School, Akron's oldest Catholic school still in operation. At the time of the merger, St. Vincent High School had graduated over 6,000 students.

Athletics

STVM'S biggest rivals include Archbishop Hoban High School and Walsh Jesuit High School.

State championships 

 Football – 1972, 1981, 1982, 1988, 2012, 2013
 Boys' basketball – 1929**, 1984, 2000, 2001, 2003, 2009, 2011, 2017, 2018, 2021, 2022
 Baseball – 1986, 1989
 Boys' golf – 1927*
 Wrestling – 2001
 Girls' cross country – 2009, 2010, 2011, 2012, 2013
 Girls' basketball – 1979, 1980, 1995
 Girls' softball – 1979, 1984
 Boys' track – 2011, 2013
 Girls' track – 2012
* Title won by St. Mary High School prior to merger with St. Vincent.

** Title won by St. Vincent High School prior to merger with St. Mary

Notable alumni

 Parris Campbell, NFL player
 Jalen Hudson, NBA G League player
 LeBron James, NBA player
 Dru Joyce, professional basketball player and college coach
 William Jurgens, Catholic priest, author, composer, and historian
Niko Lalos, NFL player
 Jerome Lane, NBA player
 Tony Laterza, college basketball head coach
 Sandra Pianalto, United States Federal Reserve
 JaKarr Sampson, NBA player
 Frank Stams, NFL player
 Romeo Travis, professional basketball player
 Brian Windhorst, author and reporter for ESPN
 Malaki Branham, NBA player

References

External links
School website

High schools in Akron, Ohio
Catholic secondary schools in Ohio
Marianist schools
Educational institutions established in 1897
Roman Catholic Diocese of Cleveland
Sports in Akron, Ohio
1897 establishments in Ohio